The Coate-Loury model of affirmative action was developed by Stephen Coate and Glenn Loury in 1993. The model seeks to answer the question of whether, by mandating expanded opportunities for minorities in the present, these policies are rendered unnecessary in the future. Affirmative action may lead to one of two outcomes:

 By improving employers’ perceptions of minorities or improving minorities’ skills, or both, affirmative action policies would eventually cause employers to want to hire minorities regardless of the presence of affirmative action policies.
 By dampening incentives for minorities, affirmative action policies would reduce minority skill investment, thus leading to an equilibrium where employers correctly believe minorities to be less productive than majorities, thus perpetuating the need for affirmative action in order to achieve parity in the labor market.

Coate and Loury concluded that either equilibrium is possible under certain assumptions.

Model framework 
The exposition of the Coate-Loury model follows the notes of David Autor. The authors make three assumptions as a starting point for their model:

 The underlying skill distributions of minorities and non-minorities are the same. This skill distribution is modeled as a distribution of costs of obtaining a qualification.
 Employers cannot observe qualifications but do observe noisy signals that are correlated with it.
 Employers have rational expectations about worker qualifications and workers have rational expectations about employer screening. Thus, in equilibrium, employers beliefs about worker qualifications will be confirmed. And, similarly, workers will make investments consistent with the returns they will receive in the labor market for those investments.

Employers can assign workers to either Task 0 or Task 1, with only qualified workers being successful at Task 1. Employers get a net return  from assigning a worker to Task 1 of the form:The ratio of net gain to loss .

Let  be the probability that the signal does not exceed , given that the worker is qualified;  is the probability that the signal does not exceed , given that the worker is unqualified. This implies that:Therefore, higher values of the signal are more likely if the worker is qualified. This implies that  has the monotone likelihood ratio (MLR) property.

Employers' decision rule 
Using Bayes' rule, the employer’s posterior probability that the worker is qualified, given the worker’s signal, is:

Workers' investment decision 
Given the assumption that employers have rational expectations, only the true probability that a worker is qualified should matter - not the employer's beliefs about the probability.

Since the boundary points are equal to zero, it follows that  must sometimes be above 1 and sometimes below 1 in the interval.

Workers will invest if , so the share of workers investing will be .

Equilibrium 
An equilibrium is a fixed point of the aforementioned hiring and investment policies where beliefs are self-confirming, such that:A discriminatory equilibrium  can occur whenever the equilibrium equation has multiple solutions.

Proposition 1 (p. 1226) proves that, under reasonable conditions, if a solution exists to the equilibrium condition, then at least two solutions will exist. At this point, there are several observations that can be made:

 Group identity conveys information only because employers expect it to.
 Stereotypes are inefficient sources of information.
 No single employer could break the discriminatory equilibrium.
 The employer's expected benefit from hiring a  worker exceeds that of hiring a  worker.

Affirmative action 
Under the assumption that a discriminatory equilibrium exists, with the further assumption of no differences in skill distributions, an affirmative action policy can be easily rationalized.

Let  be the ex ante probability that a worker is assigned to Task 1:And let  be the expected payoff from hiring this worker:Under affirmative action, the employers' optimization problem is to solve:where the equality constraint on the ex ante probabilities is the affirmative action constraint. The equivalent Lagrangian  is:where  is the Lagrange multiplier. Proposition 2 (p. 1229) develops a condition for the existence of a nondiscriminatory equilibrium under affirmative action. In particular, if any group of workers facing standard  invest so that the fraction  is qualified, then all equilibria are self-confirming:In this case, the affirmative action policy would equate employers' beliefs about members of each group.

Patronizing equilibrium 
However, it is not in general true that affirmative action under the model's assumptions leads to the nondiscriminatory equilibrium. If at  the employer lowered the threshold , then the fraction of workers investing would fall, and the employers' beliefs about the fraction who are qualified would not be satisfied. Therefore, a policy that lowered  would not be self-enforcing.

 Due to a lower standard, members of  find it optimal to invest less in skills acquisition, which then confirms employers' negative views
 Despite being initially identical, reduced investment leads to a divergence between groups and the development of a negative stereotype

Recalling the Lagrangian that was developed earlier, we may consider the first-order optimality conditions.

See also 

 Labour economics
 Law and economics
 Mathematical economics
 Statistical discrimination (economics)

References

Further reading 

 Fryer Jr., Roland G.; Loury, Glenn C. (2005). "Affirmative Action and Its Mythology". Journal of Economic Perspectives 19 (3): 147-162.

Affirmative action
Labour economics
Law and economics
Mathematical economics